Sinan Akkuş (born 17 December 1971) is a Turkish-German director, writer and actor.

Life and work
Sinan Akkuş was born in Turkey. As a child he moved to Germany in 1973. After graduating from high school in Kassel, he studied philosophy, German language and literature from 1992 to 1994. In 1994 he also began studying visual communication with a focus on film and television.
In addition, Akkuş worked for the film and television production company kigali-films, where he was involved in camera work, editing and conception of corporate videos. In 1995 he attended the Escuela Internacional de Cine y Televisión as an exchange student in Cuba. In 2000 he graduated from the Kunsthochschule Kassel with a focus on film and television.

Afterwards, Akkuş made a few short films, which received several awards and honours. His short film Lassie (2002), for example, received the rating especially worthwhile from the German Deutsche Film- und Medienbewertung (FBW). His feature film debut  (2008) also received this rating. In this Culture clash - comedy, Akkuş takes on the subject of marriage among and by ethnic Turks in Germany and the associated difficulties. The film received the audience award Lüdia at the Kinofest Lünen in November 2008 and was released in German cinemas on 1 October 2009. 

In 2015, Akkuş' feature film 3 Türken und ein Baby, to which he also wrote the screenplay and in which the German rapper Eko Fresh and the actors Kostja Ullmann and Kida Khodr Ramadan play the leading roles, was released in German cinemas. 3 Türken und ein Baby received the rating worthwhile from the Deutsche Film- und Medienbewertung (FBW) and was nominated for the Civis Media Prize in 2015. One of the last director's works by Akkuş, the television film Fischer sucht Frau was nominated for the TV Producer Award at the Hamburg Film Festival in 2018.

Akkuş also appears as an actor. Among others, he played in the first season of the ProSieben - TV series Stromberg the character Sinan Turçulu, a colleague and one of the strongest competitors of the series main character Bernd Stromberg. Turculu also appears in the feature film Stromberg - Der Film of the series. In the TV series Dr. Psycho – Die Bösen, die Bullen, meine Frau und ich Akkuş had a guest appearance in the episode Der Türke, where he played a police informer.

Furthermore, Akkuş was also active as a juror for film festivals such as the Bamberger Kurzfilmtage or the Independent Days International Filmfest and works as a lecturer at the acting school IAF - Internationale Akademie für Filmschauspiel in Cologne.

Filmography (selection)

Director / screenwriter 
 1997: Zeig Dich (short film), (director, screenwriter)
 2003: Lassie (short film), (director)
 2004: Sevda heißt Liebe (short film), (director, screenwriter, producer)
 2008:  (feature film), (director, screenwriter)
 2015: 3 Türken und ein Baby (feature film), (director, screenwriter)
 2018: Fischer sucht Frau (television film), (director)
 2019: Fast perfekt verliebt (television film), (director)

Actor 
 2000: Fußball ist unser Leben (feature film) - Directed by Tomy Wigand 
 2000: Just the Beginning (feature film) – Directed by Pierre Franckh
 2001: Sheriff (feature film) – Directed by Mihael Langauer
 2003: Lassie (short film) – Directed by Sinan Akkuş
 2004: Stromberg (TV series), (Appearance in 8 episodes) – Directed by Arne Feldhusen
 2007: Dr. Psycho – Die Bösen, die Bullen, meine Frau und ich (TV series) – Directed by Richard Huber
 2008:  (feature film) – Directed by Sinan Akkuş
 2013: Dear Courtney (feature film) – Directed by Rolf Roring
 2013: 00 Schneider – Im Wendekreis der Eidechse (feature film) - Directed by Helge Schneider
 2013: King Ping – Tippen Tappen Tödchen (feature film) - Directed by Claude Giffel, Dirk Michael Häger 
 2014: Stromberg – Der Film (feature film) – Directed by Arne Feldhusen
 2015: 3 Türken und ein Baby (feature film) – Directed by Sinan Akkuş
 2016: Die Gelben Teufel (short film) – Directed by Bernd Hackmann
 2018: Fischer sucht Frau (television film) – Directed by Sinan Akkuş
 2019: Fast perfekt verliebt (television film) – Directed by Sinan Akkuş

Other 
 2009: The Village (Köy), (short film), (cinematographer) – Directed by Mustafa Dok

Awards and nominations
2001: Friedrich-Wilhelm-Murnau-Award at the Day of the German Short Film for Sevda heißt Liebe
2002: Audience Award at the film festival Kinofest Lünen for Lassie
2003: Audience Award at the Exground Filmfest in Wiesbaden, Germany for Lassie
2003: Nomination at the German Filmfestival Max Ophüls Preis in the category Best Short Film for Lassie
2008: Merit Award at the Achtung Berlin Film Festival for Evet, I Do!
2008: Nomination for the award MFG Star at the Baden-Baden TV Film Festival for Evet, I Do!
2009: Prize Lüdia at the film festival Kinofest Lünen in the category Best Feature Film for Evet, I Do!
2009: Berndt-Media-Award at the film festival Kinofest Lünen in the category Best Film Title for Evet, I Do!
2010: Nomination at the German Film Critics Association Awards in the category Best Feature Film Debut for Evet, I Do!
2015: Nomination at the Civis Media Prize in the category CIVIS European Cinema Prize for 3 Türken & ein Baby

References

External links

1971 births
Turkish emigrants to Germany
Living people
Mass media people from Kassel
German male film actors
German male television actors
Turkish male film actors
Turkish male television actors
20th-century German male actors
21st-century German male actors
People from Erzincan
Actors from Kassel